Arnous may refer to:

Hussein Arnous (born 1953), Syrian politician who has served as Prime Minister of Syria
Jules Arnous de Rivière (1830–1905), French chess player

See also
Arnoux